Donald Kinman  Hill (September 18, 1904 – February 9, 1967) was an American football player. He played in the National Football League (NFL) during the 1929 season with the Chicago Cardinals and the Green Bay Packers.

References

External links
 
 

1904 births
1967 deaths
American football centers
American football halfbacks
American football quarterbacks
Green Bay Packers players
Stanford Cardinal football players
People from Hiawatha, Kansas
Players of American football from Kansas